The 1968 NCAA College Division football rankings are from the United Press International poll of College Division head coaches and from the Associated Press.  The 1968 NCAA College Division football season was the 11th year UPI published a Coaches Poll in what was termed the "Small College" division and the ninth year for the AP version of the poll. This was the first year AP had a "Top 20" instead of a "Top 10".

The AP poll did not include Win/Loss records in the weekly rankings until the fifth week of polling. In the UPI poll, the Win/Loss records were published for the Top 10 in all weeks. If a team's record was provided in one poll in a particular week, it's been copied to the other poll.

Legend

The AP poll

The UPI Coaches poll

Notes

References

Rankings
NCAA College Division football rankings